Gibraltar Savings and Loan Association was an American bank operating in California, Washington, and Florida. It was organized as a savings and loan and failed in 1989.

Overview
Its headquarters building at 9111 Wilshire Boulevard in Beverly Hills, was built in 1958, designed by William Pereira.

U.S. federal regulators seized assets of the bank in 1989. Its assets included $13.4 billion and the Los Angeles Equestrian Center, later transferred to Del Ray, a Burbank-based development firm. At the time, it was one of the largest insolvencies in U.S. history. It was later acquired by Security Pacific National Bank, then the fifth largest bank in the United States.

References

 Two savings units with large losses taken over by U.S. New York Times April 1, 1989 
 Ex-Gibraltar S&L Chief Fixes Blame : Thayer Says Money Brokers Caused Liquidity Problems Los Angeles Times April 4, 1989 
 The Rock In Pieces : How Gibraltar Savings Made a Mess of Itself, Ending Up in the Hands of Federal Regulators Los Angeles Times April 16, 1989 
 Gibraltar To Sell Off Portfolio New York Times June 3, 1989 
 Gibraltar Thrifts' Loss Hits $337.5 Million in Quarter Los Angeles Times August 26, 1989 
 Drexel's Junk Network : U.S. Says the Firm Had Some Local S&Ls on Very Sweet Strings Los Angeles Times November 16, 1990 
  RTC Files Suit Against Nine Ex-Officials of Gibraltar Savings AP News Archive October 2, 1992 

Savings and loan crisis
Banks disestablished in 1989
Defunct banks of the United States
William Pereira buildings